John Marriott may refer to:
John Marriott (poet) (1780–1825), English poet and clergyman
Sir John Marriott (British politician) (1859–1945), British historian and member of Parliament
Jack Marriott (Royal Navy officer) (1879–1938), British Royal Navy officer
John Marriott (actor) (1893–1977), American actor
Sir John Charles Oakes Marriott (1895–1978), British Army officer during World War I and World War II
John Marriott (Australian politician) (1913–1994), Australian Senator
Sir John Marriott (philatelist) (1922–2001), British philatelist, Keeper of the Royal Philatelic Collection
Jackie Marriott (1928–2016), footballer
John Marriott (footballer), Australian rules footballer in the SANFL